Studence is name of two Slovenian settlements:
 Studence, Hrastnik, in Hrastnik municipality;
 Studence, Žalec, in Žalec municipality.